National Highway 130D, commonly referred to as NH 130D is a national highway in  India. It is a spur road of National Highway 30. NH-130D traverses the states of Chhattisgarh and Maharashtra in India.

Route 

 Chhattisgarh

Kondagaon, Narainpur, Kutul - Maharashtra Border.

 Maharashtra

Chhattisgarh Border - Bingunda, Laheri, Dhodraj, Bhamragard, Hemalkasa, Allapalli.

Junctions 

  Terminal near Kondagaon.
  Terminal near Allapalli.

See also 

 List of National Highways in India
 List of National Highways in India by state

References

External links 

 NH 130D on OpenStreetMap

National highways in India
National Highways in Maharashtra
National Highways in Chhattisgarh